Quentin Fercoq (born 5 March 1999) is a French short track speed skater.

He participated at the 2022 Winter Olympics, and won a medal at the 2022 World Short Track Speed Skating Championships.

References

External links

1999 births
Living people
French male short track speed skaters
People from Harfleur
World Short Track Speed Skating Championships medalists
Short track speed skaters at the 2022 Winter Olympics
Short track speed skaters at the 2016 Winter Youth Olympics
Universiade medalists in short track speed skating
Universiade silver medalists for France
Competitors at the 2019 Winter Universiade
Medalists at the 2019 Winter Universiade
Olympic short track speed skaters of France
Sportspeople from Seine-Maritime
21st-century French people
Competitors at the 2023 Winter World University Games
Medalists at the 2023 Winter World University Games
Universiade gold medalists for France